Darżlubie  (Kashubian Darżlëbié) is a village in the administrative district of Gmina Puck, within Puck County, Pomeranian Voivodeship, in northern Poland.

Darżlubie has a population of 788.  The village gives its name to Puszcza Darżlubska, a place of Polish and Jewish martyrology during World War II.

History

References

Villages in Puck County